UNITEL (UNIVERSAL DE TELEVISIÓN) is a Bolivian commercial television network headquartered in Santa Cruz de la Sierra, Bolivia. It was founded in 1987. It is owned by businessman Osvaldo Monasterio Nieme. The company broadcasts sports, entertainment, political programs, and daily news programs nationwide in the South American country.

The channel has broadcasting rights for sporting events such as the Bolivian Professional Football League and the World Cup since 2002. However, no league matches are broadcast live, but sold through streaming rights in Bolivia.

It broadcast several beauty projects, such as Miss Santa Cruz, Miss Bolivia, Reina Hispanoamericana, Miss Universe and Miss World from 2001 to 2017.

Since 2006, Unitel began broadcasting 24 hours of daily programming.

In mid-2013 it became the first Bolivian television station to broadcast, with its own production, an international format of the production company Endemol, Yo Me Llamo Bolivia.

Since August 2014, the channel broadcasts the youth program specialized in TVN Chile license games, called Calle7 Bolivia.

In 2018, the channel acquired the transmission licenses for Bolivia for the 2018 FIFA World Cup matches.

From 2 April 2018, the channel launched its own high-definition signal within the digital terrestrial television system under test, until 15 April, when it began broadcasting with the name of Unitel HD.

History
The channel originates from the purchase of ABC by "Illimani de Comunicaciones" and its subsequent sale to Tito Asbún, owner of Taquiña. In Santa Cruz de la Sierra, Illimani de Comunicaciones terminated the contract with the Monasterio family, beginning to operate through Channel 5. After several negotiations, the Monasterio group kept the shares of Telesistema Boliviano in La Paz and Oruro.

In April 1996, Unitel began broadcasting the CONMEBOL France 98 Qualifiers where it broadcast the away matches of the Bolivian Soccer Team against the teams of Venezuela, Peru, Colombia, Ecuador and Argentina live for all of Bolivia, as well as the Monasterio family channel broadcast the three games of those South American qualifiers for France '98 also live for all of Bolivia.

In September 1997, the channel was officially launched via satellite and shortly thereafter it obtained national coverage. Today, it is considered one of the largest privately owned television networks in Bolivia.

From 2 April 2018, the channel launched its own high-definition signal within the Bolivian digital terrestrial television system in the test phase, until 15 April, when broadcasts officially started under the name of Unitel HD. In June 2018, the channel broadcast live 32 matches of the 2018 Russia World Cup in HD, becoming the first broadcast of a World Cup in HD in Bolivia.

In March 2021, Unitel removes all series that go past midnight (being replaced by Pare de Sufrir).

In the midst of the broadcast of the subnational elections, Unitel signed with WarnerMedia and ViacomCBS, broadcasting the series The Looney Tunes Show, Tom and Jerry, the Justice League and My Life as a Teenage Robot.

Programming
Unitel's main news program is called Telepaís, with nationwide coverage and its own broadcast in the departments of Santa Cruz, Cochabamba and La Paz. The channel has owned the broadcasting rights for sporting events such as the Bolivian Professional Football League and the World Cups since 2002. However, it does not broadcast any league matches live, but rather resells the broadcasting rights to cable companies in Bolivia.

The channel also broadcast various beauty pageants, such as Miss Santa Cruz, Miss Bolivia, Reina Hispanoamericana, Miss Universe and Miss World from 2001 to 2017.

Since 2006, Unitel began broadcasting 24 hours of daily programming.

In mid-2013, it became the first Bolivian television channel to broadcast, with its own production, an international format from the production company Endemol, Yo Me Llamo Bolivia.

Since the 2014 general elections, he premieres his program Asi Decidimos during electoral times.

Since August 2014, the channel broadcasts the TVN's specialized gaming license program, called Calle 7 Bolivia.

At the end of February 2016, La Fábrica de Estrellas – Star Academy, a singing reality show produced in association with Endemol and hosted by Anabel Angus and Angélica Mérida.

In 2018, the channel acquired transmission licenses for Bolivia for the 2018 Russian World Cup matches.

On 2 April 2018, the channel launched its own high-definition signal within the Bolivian digital terrestrial television system in a test phase, until 15 April, when it officially began broadcasting under the Unitel HD name.
 
In June 2018, the Unitel Network broadcasts live 32 matches of the  Russia 2018 World Cup by open signal, becoming the first television channel to broadcast a football world cup in quality HD for the Bolivian territory.

As of 16 July 2018, Red Unitel premieres Despéiname la vida, the first telenovela fiction produced in Bolivia. This teleseries is broadcast in prime time with Grisel Quiroga, Ronico Cuellar and Susy Diab as the main stars.

In the context of the 2020 coronavirus disease pandemic, the channel did not stop broadcasting Calle 7. The channel was forced to suspend broadcasts of the show on 3 April 2020.

On 11 July 2022, the transmission of MasterChef Bolivia begins, under the MasterChef kitchen franchise.

Current programs

Original 
 Chicostatión
 A Todo Deporte
 Decibeles
 El abogado del diablo
 Cine Aventura

Logos

Announcers 
 Waldo Montenegro (2009–present)
 Juan Carlos Diaz (since 2014, narrator and announcer of Telepaís)

References

External links
UNITEL Online

Spanish-language television stations
Television in Bolivia
Television channels and stations established in 1987
Mass media in Santa Cruz de la Sierra